Carlos Serrano (born 1963) is a Colombian musician.

Carlos Serrano may also refer to:

Carlos Gerardo Rodríguez Serrano (born 1985), Mexican footballer
Carlos Garrido Serrano (born 1994), known as Carlos Garrido, Spanish footballer
Carlos Serrano, a character in the TV series ReGenesis